Some Need It Lonely is the thirty-eighth studio album by Omar Rodríguez-López as a solo artist, released on 16 December 2016. It is his twelfth and last release in the 12 album series initiated by Ipecac Recordings, although before its release the label confirmed an additional 12 records forthcoming set to continue the fortnightly release schedule.

"Archangel Trophy" was uploaded in advance as the album's single.

Track listing
All songs written by Omar Rodríguez-López.
 "Bitter Sunsets" – 3:38
 "We Might" – 1:46
 "Sanity a Dream" – 3:43
 "Zophiel" – 3:48
 "Archangel Trophy" – 3:52
 "Changes" – 2:53
 "Back to the Same" – 3:04
 "Zero Worth" – 3:07
 "Barachiel Is At It Again" – 2:31
 "Ariel" – 4:09
 "Mulu Lizi" – 4:42

Tracks 5 & 6 form a single track, as do 8 & 9.
Track 4 contains a guitar sample of The Mars Volta's "Vicarious Atonement".

Personnel
 Omar Rodríguez-López – guitars, synthesizers, bass (1, 5–7, 10), vocals (1)
 Teri Gender Bender – vocals (2, 5–9, 11)
 Cedric Bixler-Zavala – voice (3)
 Jon Theodore – drums (1, 4)
 Thomas Pridgen – drums (3, 7–9)
 Deantoni Parks – drums (5–6)
 Juan Alderete de la Peña – bass (3, 7–9)
 Marcel Rodriguez-Lopez – percussion, keyboards, synthesizers
 Adrián Terrazas-González – saxophone, percussion

Production
 Jon Debaun – engineering
 Shawn Sullivan – engineering
 Lars Stalfors – mixing
 Chris Common – mastering
 Mackie – cover art, layout

Release history

References

2016 albums
Omar Rodríguez-López albums
Ipecac Recordings albums
Albums produced by Omar Rodríguez-López